54th Guards Order of Kutuzov Rocket Division is a strategic rocket division under command of the 27th Guards Missile Army of the Strategic Rocket Forces of Russia headquartered at Teykovo in Ivanovo Oblast.

History 

The 197th Rocket Engineer Brigade was formed on 20 June 1960 on the basis of the 27th Separate Guards Artillery Brigade. It was initially under the 46th Artillery Range Administration, but from 3 October fell under the 3rd Independent Guards Missile Corps. It comprised the 594th, 602nd, 604th, and 621st Rocket Regiments. In May 1961 the brigade was reorganized into the 54th Guards Order of Kutuzov Missile Division with headquarters in the small town of Teykovo.

Since 1961, the 54th Division has performed 36 training launches.

On 27 November 1999 one of the regiments within the 54th Division received the honorific "Ivanovo". 

In December 2006, the 54th Division became the first one to receive a mobile version of the RT-2PM2 (SS-27) missile.

In 2010, the 54th Division became the first unit to receive the RS-24 missile.

Commanders 
The following officers commanded the division.
 1960–1965: Major General Boris E. Zbraylov
 1965–1969: Major General Anatoly V. Leshin
 1969–1974: Major General Vladimir P. Shilovsky
 1974–1976: Major General Igor B. Urlin
 1976–1983: Major General Ivan I. Oleynik
 1983–1987: Major General Fedor A. Byakin
 1987–1992: Major General Viktor P. Cherenov
 1992–1994: Major General Vasili S. Rudenko
 1994–1997: Major General Leonid E. Sinyakovich
 1997–1999: Major General Pavel A. Chistopolsky
 1999–2007: Major General Yuri A. Pchelintsev
 2007–2010: Colonel Igor R. Fazletdinov
 Since 2010: Colonel Oleg L. Glazunov

Equipment 
 1962–1977: R-16U;
 1968–1975: UR-100;
 1971–1991: UR-100K;
 Since 1988: RT-2PM;
 Since 10 December 2006: RT-2PM.
 Since 2009: RS-24

References

Rocket divisions of the Soviet Union
Rocket divisions of Russia
Military units and formations established in 1960